Thenkalam, officially called Tenkulam, is a village in the Tirunelveli district of Tamil Nadu, India.

Etymology
Even though the village is now widely known as Thenkalam, official records show that it was once called Tenkulam. Tenkulam must be the anglicized form of Thenkulam. Assuming this, Thenkulam can be broken into two words: Then & Kulam. 'Then' in Tamil refers to 'South' while 'Kulam' may refer to two things: Pond(குளம்) or a group of related people(குலம்). So, Thenkulam can be translated into English as 'Pond in the south' or 'People of the south'. There is a large pond to the southeast of the village, Thalaiyuthu Kulam.

Geography
Thenkalam is located in a hillocky region being surrounded by two large hillocks: one to the east and the other one to the south. The eastern hillock is called Keezhamalai which is a mere translation (Keezha-East; Malai-Hillock). The southern hillock is similarly called Therkkumalai. The neighborhood of Therkkumalai Colony is located here. The village pond, Thalaiyuthu Kulam, is built by connecting the two hillocks with an embankment. It is a rain fed farm pond which acts as a direct source of irrigation for lands in the Keelapathu and also indirectly helps agriculture by increasing the water table which rises water levels in surrounding wells.

Neighborhoods
From Sankarnagar towards the last habitation of the village, the neighborhoods are in the following order:
Therkkumalai Colony
Kamaraj Nagar
Keezha Thenkalam
Mela Thenkalam
Periyar Nagar
Nallamalpuram
Gandhi Nagar
Thenkalam Pudur
Puliyankottaram

Utilities
Thenkalam houses a Post Office, a Bank, a Veterinary centre, and hence is an important centre of business in the area. There is also a common service centre (E-Sevai Maiyam) at Keezha Thenkalam near Keezha Amman Kovil where one can avail various e-services. Electricity is supplied by Tamil Nadu Electricity Board(TNEB). Thalaiyuthu Sub-Station of TNEB is the local body responsible for power supply in the village.

Transport
Thenkalam is well connected with Tirunelveli Old Bus Stand by bus, average journey time being 40 minutes. Buses with boards of:
Thenkalam pudur (தென்கலம்புதூர்)
Alavanthankulam (அலவந்தான்குளம்)
Therkku Chezhiyanallur (தெற்கு செழியநல்லூர்)
Nanjankulam (நாஞ்சான்குளம்)
Rastha/Nallamalpuram (ரஸ்தா/நல்லம்மாள்புரம்) - Only Route no.40
Madhavakurichi/Manur (மதவக்குறிச்சி/மானூர்) - Only Route no.33C
Pallamadai (பள்ளமடை) - Only Route no.3J
- go to the village. A 33A private Therkku Chezhiyanallur bus shunts up to Thenkalam twice a day.

The nearest railway station is Talaiyuthu where only passenger trains stop. Tirunelveli Junction is the nearest major railhead with daily trains to Chennai, Bengaluru, Madurai, Salem, Tiruchirappalli, Thiruvananthapuram, Kochi, Coimbatore; weekly trains to Hyderabad, Kolkata and a bi-weekly to Delhi(Thirukural Express).

The nearest airport, Tuticorin Airport, is connected with chennai by two daily flights. The nearest international airport is at Madurai.

Schools
Panchayat Union Elementary Schools (ஊராட்சி ஒன்றிய தொடக்கப் பள்ளிகள்) - Keezha Thenkalam, Nallammalpuram and Thenkalam Pudur
Government ADW Higher Secondary School, Nallammalpuram - Separate campuses for Boys and Girls
T.D.T.A School
St.Paul's Nursery and Primary School
Star School

The last two of the five are Private Schools.

Notable people
Daniel Selvaraj, Sahitya Akademi Award winning Tamil writer.
S. Ashok Kumar who has served as a judge in various courts of law, was born in Thenkalam Pudur - a hamlet under the administration of Thenkalam Panchayat.

References

Villages in Tirunelveli district